was a Japanese video game development company that worked under a publishing agreement with Nintendo. They were best known for making spin-off games for the Pokémon video game franchise, particularly the Pokémon Rumble series. Ambrella was formerly a part of Marigul Management.

Overview 
Ambrella developed the Nintendo 64 voice recognition game, Hey You, Pikachu! in 1998, Pokémon Channel for the Nintendo GameCube in 2003, and Pokémon Dash for the Nintendo DS in 2004. Ambrella developed My Pokémon Ranch for the Wii's WiiWare service, which was released in Japan on March 25, 2008, and in North America on June 9, 2008. It developed Pokémon Rumble which was released in North America on November 16, 2009.

The company developed further entries in the Pokémon Rumble series with Pokémon Rumble Blast for Nintendo 3DS, Pokémon Rumble U for the Wii U, and Pokémon Rumble World for the Nintendo 3DS. The most recent Rumble games were released via the Nintendo eShop, and contain some variant of microtransactions; Pokémon Rumble World uses traditional microtransactions and Pokémon Rumble U uses NFC figurines that predate Amiibo.

On October 16, 2020, Creatures announced the acquisition of Ambrella; Creatures received all property rights and Ambrella was disbanded, with the employees then working under Creatures.

Games

References

External links 
Archive of the Official Marigul Website (Japanese)
Source of Company Profile (IGN)
N-Sider's article containing info about Marigul Management Inc.
Iwata Asks: Pokémon Rumble Blast

Defunct video game companies of Japan
Nintendo divisions and subsidiaries
Video game development companies
Pokémon
Video game companies established in 1996
Video game companies disestablished in 2020
Japanese companies disestablished in 2020
Japanese companies established in 1996